FC Manitoba is a Canadian soccer team based in Winnipeg, Manitoba, Canada that plays in USL League Two, the fourth tier of the United States soccer league system. The club was founded in 2010 as WSA Winnipeg. In 2020, the club was acquired by a new ownership group and re-organized and branded as FC Manitoba.

The team plays its home games at the Ralph Cantafio Soccer Complex on the FIFA-approved synthetic grass of the complex's John Scouras Field. The team's colours are navy, gold, and white.

History

WSA Winnipeg

The World Soccer Academy was founded in 2001 in Winnipeg as a youth soccer academy by Eduardo Badescu.

In December 2010, WSA Winnipeg created a semi-professional team to participate in the US-based Premier Development League to begin play in the 2011 season. This marked the return of high level soccer to the city of Winnipeg since the Winnipeg Fury of the original Canadian Soccer League ceased operations in 1993. The club was supported by Mondetta, a well-recognized brand in Canadian professional sports, as one of its primary sponsors. The team primarily fielded rosters built around local talent.

They played their debut match on May 28, 2011, against the Thunder Bay Chill, losing 1-0. They got their first win the next day in a rematch versus the Chill, winning 3-0. The first goal in franchise history was scored by Kenny Sacramento. In their first season, they played an exhibition match against Italian Serie A club AS Roma.

FC Manitoba
In January 2020, the team was purchased by the Garcea Group of Companies and renamed FC Manitoba, while revamping the entire development system of the club, separating from the World Soccer Academy. The team also received new colours and a new logo. The new team's debut season in 2020 was cancelled due to the COVID-19 pandemic. In September 2020, they signed former Serie A player Michele Paolucci to a contract. Due to the travel restrictions as a result of the continuing pandemic, the team opted out of the 2021 USL League Two season as well. Instead, in 2021, they participated in the 2021 Summer Series with other Canadian semi-professional and amateur clubs. FC Manitoba would return to USL2 for the 2022 season.

Year-by-year

Head coaches
Eduardo Badescu (2011–2019)
Tony Mazza (2020)
Jose Borg (2021–)

Notable former players
The following players have either played at the professional or international level, either before or after playing for the PDL/USL2 team:
{{cmn|colwidth=18em|
  Kyle Hiebert

Affiliate team
FC Manitoba also operates an affiliate team, Ital-Inter SC, in Premier Division of the Manitoba Major Soccer League.

Women's team
In 2021, they announced that they would be creating a women's team. They were set to join the semi-professional US-based Women's Premier Soccer League.

References

External links
 
Official USL League Two site

Association football clubs established in 2010
USL League Two teams
Soccer clubs in Winnipeg
2010 establishments in Manitoba
Expatriated football clubs